Gopinathpur is a small village in Hinjili, Ganjam district, Odisha, India.  the 2011 Census of India, it had a population of 2,036 across 443 households.

References 

Villages in Ganjam district